Maytenus magellanica (Magellan's mayten or hard log mayten; leña dura in Spanish) is a small evergreen tree from the genus Maytenus, up to 5 meters (16 ft), in the Celastraceae. It grows in southern Argentina and Chile from 36ºS to Cape Horn (56ºS).

Description
Leaves alternate, petiole 2–6 mm long, leaves are elliptic-lanceolate 2–6 cm long and 1,5–3 cm wide, thick and leathery, apex and base are attenuate, irregularly toothed margins. Reddish and deciduous stipules. Flowers are hermaphrodite or unisexual, in groups of 2–3 in the axils; five sepals about 1 mm long; five petals wine colored in 2–3,5 mm, ovary reduced in male flowers with five stamens; in female, the ovoid ovary ends in a short style and this in its turn, in flat bi-lobed stigmas. Fruit capsule  6–8 long and 5 mm wide, two valves which contain 1 to 2 seeds.

Distribution and ecology
This shrub is relatively widespread and can endure rather harsh settings of windblown Patagonia including rocky soils of the Patagonian steppes. Distributed in southern Chile and Argentina, it is found as far south as the gelid climate of Tierra del Fuego. An example of its occurrence in the northern part of its range is the environment of Cueva del Milodon Natural Monument.

Cultivation and uses
It is planted as ornamental tree. As its native range includes the subpolar Tierra del Fuego, the plant's hardiness is appreciated and it has been successfully introduced in the Faroe islands.

Line notes

References
  Benoit, I. L., ed. 1989. Libro Rojo de la Flora Terrestre de Chile (1ª Parte) CONAF. Santiago de Chile. 157 p.
 Hoffman, Adriana. 1982. Flora silvestre de Chile, Zona Araucana. Edición 4. Fundación Claudio Gay, Santiago. 258p.
 Muñoz, M. 1980. Flora del Parque Nacional Puyehue. Editorial Universitaria, Santiago, Chile. 557p.

 C. Michael Hogan, Cueva del Milodon, Megalithic Portal, 13 April 2008

External links

magellanica
Flora of southern Chile
Flora of South Argentina
Garden plants of South America
Ornamental trees
Trees of mild maritime climate
Trees of subpolar oceanic climate